RK Železničar Niš was a Serbian handball club based in Niš.

History
The club played its first competitive game on 26 July 1949, which is considered to be the club's foundation date. They went on to compete in the Yugoslav Championship for over 20 seasons. In 1976–77, the club won its first trophy, the Yugoslav Cup. They subsequently reached the Cup Winners' Cup final in 1978, losing to VfL Gummersbach.

On 7 September 2009, the club merged with ORK Niš to form RK Naissus.

Honours
Yugoslav Cup / FR Yugoslavia Cup
 1976–77, 1981–82, 1984–85 / 1996–97, 1998–99

Sponsorship
During its history, the club has been known by a variety of names due to sponsorship reasons:
 Jugopetrol Železničar
 NIS Petrol Železničar

Notable players
The list includes players who played for their respective national teams in any major international tournaments, such as the Olympic Games, World Championships and European Championships:

  Tonči Peribonio
  Dalibor Čutura
  Ivan Gajić
  Miloš Kostadinović
  Nemanja Pribak
  Ivan Lapčević
  Predrag Peruničić
  Časlav Grubić
  Dragan Mladenović
  Rolando Pušnik
  Zoran Živković

Head coaches
  Zoran Živković
  Sava Đorđević
  Zoran Živković
  Svetislav Jovanović

References

External links
 RK Železničar Niš – EHF competition record
 RK Železničar Niš at srbijasport.net 

Zeleznicar Nis
Handball clubs established in 1949
1949 establishments in Yugoslavia
Handball clubs disestablished in 2009
2009 disestablishments in Serbia
Sport in Niš